Myrciaria rupestris is a species of plant in the family Myrtaceae. It is endemic to west Cuba. Plinia rubrinervis and Plinia rupestris were transferred to Myrciaria as this single species in 2014.

References

rupestris
Crops originating from the Americas
Tropical fruit
Flora of Central America
Cauliflory
Fruit trees
Berries
Plants described in 2014
Endemic flora of Cuba